The 18th Annual Latin Grammy Awards was held on November 16, 2017, at the MGM Grand Garden Arena in Las Vegas. It was broadcast on Univision at 8PM ET\PT. This marked the tenth year Las Vegas hosts the Latin Grammy Awards and also marked the telecasts return to the MGM Grand Garden Arena.

Performers
 Residente – "Hijos del Cañaveral"
 Alejandro Fernández – "Quiero Que Vuelvas" and "México Lindo y Querido"
 Natalia Lafourcade with Carlos Rivera, Flor de Toloache and  Los Macorinos – "Mexicana Hermosa" and "Tú Si Sabes Quererme"
 Maluma – "Felices los 4"
 Alejandro Sanz – "Cuando Nadie Me Ve", "No Es Lo Mismo" and "Corazón Partío"
 J Balvin with Bad Bunny, French Montana and Steve Aoki – "Si Tu Novio Te Deja Sola", "Unforgettable" and "Mi Gente"
 Rubén Blades – "Arayue"
 Juanes with Logic and Alessia Cara – "Es Tarde" and "1-800-273-8255"
 CNCO – "Reggaetón Lento (Bailemos)"
 Banda El Recodo and Lila Downs – "En mi Viejo San Juan"
 Nicky Jam – "El Amante"
 Sebastián Yatra and Carlos Vives – "Devuélveme El Corazón" and "Robarte un Beso"
 Ha*Ash and Grupo Bronco – "Adoro"
 Mon Laferte – "Amárrame"
 Vicente García – "Carmesí" / Danay Suárez – "Yo Aprendí" / Sofía Reyes – "Llegaste Tú"
 Luis Fonsi with Bomba Estéreo, Victor Manuelle and Diplo – "Despacito"

Postponement of Nominations Announcement

Nominations were to be announced on September 20, 2017. However, due to the earthquake in Mexico which occurred a previous day, as well as other natural disasters that affected Spanish-speaking communities, the Latin Recording Academy did not announce the nominations until Tuesday, September 26.

This marked the second time when the Latin Recording Academy had to delay or cancel one of their signature events. In 2001, the Latin Recording Academy was forced to cancel the 2nd Annual Latin Grammy Awards due to the September 11 attacks. Instead, the winners of those awards were announced at a press conference the following month. The 18th Annual Latin Grammy Awards were still held on time, on November 16, 2017, despite the delay of the announcement of the nominations.

Nominees and winners
The following is the list of nominees.

General
Record of the Year
Luis Fonsi featuring Daddy Yankee — "Despacito"
 Rubén Blades — "La flor de la canela"
 Jorge Drexler — "El Surco"
 Alejandro Fernández — "Quiero Que Vuelvas"
 Juanes featuring Kali Uchis — "El Ratico"
 Mon Laferte featuring Juanes — "Amárrame"
 Maluma — "Felices los 4"
 Ricky Martin featuring Maluma — "Vente Pa' Ca"
 Residente — "Guerra"
 Shakira featuring Maluma — "Chantaje"

Album of the Year
Rubén Blades with Roberto Delgado & Orquesta — Salsa Big Band
 Antonio Carmona — Obras Son Amores
 Vicente García — A La Mar
 Nicky Jam — Fénix
 Juanes — Mis Planes Son Amarte
 Mon Laferte — La Trenza
 Natalia Lafourcade — Musas
 Residente — Residente
 Shakira — El Dorado
 Danay Suárez — Palabras Manuales

Song of the Year
Daddy Yankee, Erika Ender and Luis Fonsi — "Despacito" (Luis Fonsi featuring Daddy Yankee)
 Mon Laferte — "Amárrame" (Mon Laferte featuring Juanes) 
 Kevin Mauricio Jiménez Londoño, Bryan Snaider Lezcano Chaverra, Joel Antonio López Castro, Maluma and Shakira — "Chantaje" (Shakira featuring Maluma) 
 Descemer Bueno and Melendi — "Desde Que Estamos Juntos" (Melendi)
 Ricardo Arjona — "Ella"  
 Mario Cáceres, Kevin Mauricio Jiménez Londoño, Maluma, Servando Primera, Stiven Rojas and Bryan Snaider Lezcano Chaverra — "Felices los 4" (Maluma)  
 Residente and Jeff Trooko — "Guerra" (Residente)
 Diana Fuentes and Tommy Torres — "La Fortuna" 
 Natalia Lafourcade — "Tú Sí Sabes Quererme"  
 Nermin Harambasic, Maluma, Ricky Martin, Mauricio Montaner, Ricky Montaner, Lars Pedersen, Carl Ryden, Justin Stein, Ronny Vidar Svendsen and Anne Judith Stokke Wik — "Vente Pa' Ca" (Ricky Martin featuring Maluma)

Best New Artist
Vicente García
 Paula Arenas
 CNCO
 Martina La Peligrosa
 Mau y Ricky
 Rawayana
 Sofía Reyes
 Rosalía
 Danay Suárez
 Sebastián Yatra

Pop
Best Contemporary Pop Vocal Album
Shakira — El Dorado
 David Bisbal — Hijos del Mar
 Alejandro Fernández — Rompiendo Fronteras
 Camila Luna — Flora y Faῦna
 Sebastián Yatra — Extended Play Yatra

Best Traditional Pop Vocal Album
Lila Downs — Salón, Lágrimas y Deseo
 Franco De Vita — Libre
 Juan Gabriel — Vestido de Etiqueta por Eduardo Magallanes
 Ednita Nazario — Una Vida
 Yordano — El Tren de los Regresos

Urban
Best Urban Fusion/Performance
Luis Fonsi and Daddy Yankee featuring Justin Bieber — "Despacito" (Remix)
 J Balvin featuring Bad Bunny — "Si Tu Novio Te Deja Sola"
 Nicky Jam — "El Amante"
 Residente — "Dagombas En Tamale"
 Shakira featuring Maluma — "Chantaje"

Best Urban Music Album
Residente — Residente
 J Álvarez — Big Yauran
 Kase.O — El Círculo
 Arianna Puello — Rap Komunion
 Rael — Coisas Do Meu Imaginário

Best Urban Song
Rafael Arcaute, Igor Koshkendey and Residente — "Somos Anormales" (Residente)
 Emicida and Rael — "A Chapa É Quente!" (Língua Franca)
 Luis Díaz, Alejandro Estrada, Bruno Og and Jonathan Torres — "Coqueta" (Ghetto Kids)
 Nicky Jam, Juan Diego Medina Vélez and Cristhian Mena — "El Amante" (Nicky Jam)
 J Balvin, Camila Cabello, Phillip Kembo, Johnny Michell, Pitbull, Rosina "Soaky Siren" Russell, Jamie Sanderson and Tinashe "T-Collar" Sibanda — "Hey Ma (Spanish version)" (Pitbull and J Balvin featuring Camila Cabello)
 Lápiz Consciente and Vico C — "Papa"

Rock
Best Rock Album
Diamante Eléctrico — La Gran Oscilación
 Daniel Cadena — Mutante
 De la Tierra — II
 Eruca Sativa — Barro y Fauna
 Utopians — Todos Nuestros Átomos

Best Pop/Rock Album
Juanes — Mis Planes Son Amarte
 Mikel Erentxun — El Hombre Sin Sombra
 Jarabe de Palo — 50 Palos
 Miranda! — Fuerte
 Joaquín Sabina — Lo Niego Todo

Best Rock Song
Diamante Eléctrico — "Déjala Rodar" (tie)
Andrés Calamaro — "La Noche" (tie)
 Eruca Sativa — "Armas Gemelas"
 Rafa Bonilla and Jorge Holguín "Pyngwi" — "Días Contados" (Rafa Bonilla)
 Emiliano Brancciari — "Para Cuando Me Muera" (No Te Va Gustar)
 Enrique Rangel — "Que No" (Café Tacvba)

Alternative
Best Alternative Music Album
Café Tacvba — Jei Beibi
 El Cuarteto de Nos — Apocalipsis Zombi
 Mon Laferte — La Trenza
 Sig Ragga — La Promesa de Thamar
 Danay Suárez — Palabras Manuales

Best Alternative Song
Mon Laferte — "Amárrame" (Mon Laferte featuring Juanes)
 Sig Ragga — "Antonia"
 Robert Musso — "Apocalipsis Zombi" (El Cuarteto de Nos)
 Rafael Arcaute and Residente — "Apocaliptico" (Residente)
 Stephen Marley and Danay Suárez — "Integridad" (Danay Suárez)

Tropical
Best Salsa Album
Rubén Blades and Roberto Delgado & Orquesta — Salsa Big Band
 Alberto Barros — Tributo a La Salsa Colombiana 7
 Juan Pablo Díaz — Fase Dos
 Alain Pérez — ADN
 Various Artists / Isidro Infante (producer)  —  Isidro Infante Presenta: Cuba y Puerto Rico, Un Abrazo Musical Salsero

Best Cumbia/Vallenato Album
Jorge Celedón and Sergio Luis Rodríguez — Ni Un Paso Atrás
 Silvestre Dangond  — Gente Valiente
 El Gran Martín Elías and Rolando Ochoa — Sin Límites
 Juventino Ojito and Su Son Mocaná — Cumbia Del Río Magdalena
 Jorge Oñate and Alvaro López — Patrimonio Cultural

Best Contemporary Tropical Album
Guaco  — Bidimensional
 Lucas Arnau — Teatro
 Gaitanes — La Parranda De Gaitanes
 Frank Reyes — Devuélveme Mi Libertad
 Prince Royce — FIVE

Best Traditional Tropical Album
Jon Secada featuring The Charlie Sepúlveda Big Band — To Beny Moré with Love
 Albita — Albita
 El Septeto Santiaguero — Raíz
 La Colmenita (Various Artists) — El Añejo Jardín
 Babalú Quinteto — Cuba Sobre Cuerdas

Best Tropical Fusion Album
Olga Tañón — Olga Tañón y Punto.
 Colectro — Coletera
 Gabriel — Contra Corriente
 Adriana Lucía — Porrock
 Salsangroove — Salsangroove

Best Tropical Song
Vicente García — "Bachata en Kingston"
 Raul del Sol and Jorge Luis Piloto — "Cuando Beso Tu Boca" (Mojito Lite)
 Manny Cruz, Prince Royce, Daniel Santacruz and Shakira — "Deja Vu" (Prince Royce featuring Shakira)
 Medardo Rovayo — "Dejé de Amar" (Felipe Muñiz featuring Marc Anthony)
 Residente — "Hijos del Cañaveral"

Songwriter
Best Songwriting Album
Vicente García — A La Mar
 Alex Cuba — Lo Único Constante
 Santiago Cruz — Trenes, Aviones y Viajes Interplanetarios
 Erika Ender — Tatuajes
 Debi Nova — Gran Ciudad

Regional Mexican
Best Ranchera/Mariachi Music Album
Flor de Toloache — Las Caras Lindas
 Majida Issa — Pero No Llorando - Nocturna
 Mariachi Herencia de México — Nuestra Herencia
 Mariachi Imperial Azteca — Aún Estoy de Pie
 Mariachi Oro de América — 36 Aniversario Mariachi Oro de América

Best Banda Album
Banda El Recodo de Cruz Lizárraga — Ayer y Hoy
 El Chapo de Sinaloa — Mis Decretos
 Maribel Guardia — Besos Callejeros
 La Original Banda El Limón de Salvador Lizárraga — El Mayor de Mis Antojos
 Lalo Mora — Un Millón de Primaveras

Best Norteño Music Album
Los Palominos — Piénsalo
 Leonardo Aguilar — Gallo Fino
 Los Huracanes del Norte — Alma Bohemia
 Los Invasores de Nuevo León — No. 50
 Los Tercos — Los Tercos

Best Regional Mexican Song
Juan Treviño — "Siempre Es Así" (Juan Treviño featuring AJ Castillo)
 Espinoza Paz — "Compromiso Descartado" (Leonardo Aguilar)
 Horacio Palencia — "Ganas de Volver"
 Raúl Jiménez E. and Chucho Rincón — "Sentimiento Emborrachado" (Santiago Arroyo)
 Edgar Barrera, Martín Castro Ortega and Alfonso Lizárraga — "Vale la Pena" (Banda El Recodo de Cruz Lizárraga)

Instrumental
Best Instrumental Album
Michel Camilo and Tomatito — Spain Forever
 Cesar Camargo Mariano featuring Rudiger Liebermann, Walter Seyfarth and Benoit Fromanger — Joined
 Gustavo Casenave — Conversations with Vladimir Stowe
 Daniel Minimalia — Origen
 Luis Salinas — El Tren

Traditional
Best Folk Album
Natalia Lafourcade — Musas)
 Yuvisney Aguilar and Afrocuban Jazz Quartet — Piango, Piango
 Magín Díaz — El Orisha de la Rosa
 Quinteto Leopoldo Federico  — Pa' Qué Más
 Edward Ramírez and Rafa Pino  — El Tuyero Ilustrado

Best Tango Album
Fernando Otero — Solo Buenos Aires
 El Arranque — 20 Años - En Vivo En Café Vinilo
 Patricia Malanca — Bucles
 Rodolfo Mederos — 13
 Tango Orchestra — Mixturas

Best Flamenco Music Album
Vicente Amigo  — Memoria de Los Sentidos
 Diego Guerrero — Vengo Caminando
 Las Migas — Vente Conmigo
 José Mijita — Se Llama Flamenco
 La Macanita and Manuel Valencia — Directo en El Círculo Flamenco de Madrid

Jazz
Best Latin Jazz Album
Eliane Elias — Dance of Time
 Antonio Adolfo — Hybrido / From Rio To Wayne Shorter
 Oskar Cartaya — Bajo Mundo
 Charlie Sepúlveda and The Turnaround — Mr. EP - A Tribute to Eddie Palmieri
 Miguel Zenón — Típico

Portuguese language
Best Contemporary Pop Album
Tiago Iorc — Troco Likes Ao Vivo: Um Filme de Tiago Iorc
 Anavitória — Anavitória
 Mano Brown — Boogie Naipe
 Jamz — Tudo nosso
 Ludmilla — A Danada sou eu

Best Rock Album or Alternative Music
Nando Reis — Jardim-Pomar
 The Baggios — Brutown
 Blitz — Aventuras II
 Curumim — Boca
 Metá Metá — MM3

Best Samba/Pagode Album
Mart'nália — + Misturado
 Luciana Mello — Na luz do samba
 Diogo Nogueira — Alma brasileira
 Roberta Sá — Delírio no Circo
 Various Artists — Samba Book: Jorge Aragão

Best Brazilian Popular Music Album
Edu Lobo, Romero Lubambo, Mauro Senise — Dos Navegantes
 Alexandre Pires — DNA Musical
 Silva — Silva Canta Marisa
 António Zambujo — Até Pensei Que Fosse Minha
 Zanna — Zanna

Best Sertaneja Music Album
Daniel — Daniel
 Day & Lara — (...)
 Luan Santana — 1977
 Marília Mendonça — Realidade Ao Vivo em Manaus
 Simone & Simaria — Live

Best Brazilian Roots Music Album
Bruna Viola — Ao Vivo - Melodias Do Sertão Patrícia Bastos — Batom Bacaba Pinduca — No Embalo Do Trio Nordestino — Canta O Nordeste Yangos — Chamamé Various Artists — AscensãoBest Song in Portuguese Language
Ana Caetano and Tiago Iorc, songwriters — "Trevo (Tu)" (Anavitória featuring Tiago Iorc)
 Marisa Monte, Silva and Lucas Silva, songwriters — "Noturna (Nada de Novo Na Noite)" (Silva featuring Marisa Monte)
 Cauique, Diogo Leite and Rodrigo Leite, songwriters — "Pé na Areia" (Diogo Nogueira)
 Nando Reis, songwriter — "Só Posso Dizer" (Nando Reis)
 Andrei Kozyreff, Juliana Strassacapa, Sebastián Piracés-Ugarte, Mateo Piracés-Ugarte and Rafael Gomes da Silva, songwriters — "Triste, Louca ou Má" (Francisco, el Hombre)

Classical
Best Classical Album
Eddie Mora directing The Orquesta Sinfónica Nacional de Costa Rica — Música De Compositores Costarricenses Vol. 2
Nathalie Peña Comas — Alta Gracia 
Jordi Savall — Dixit Dominus: Vivaldi, Mozart, HandelHoracio Gutiérrez — Horacio Gutiérrez Plays Chopin & SchumannIn-Hong Cha conducting The Orquesta Sinfónica de Venezuela — Textures from the North of SouthBest Classical Contemporary Composition
Leo Brouwer — "Sonata del Decamerón Negro" (Mabel Millán)
 Manuel Tejada — "Ave María" (Nathalie Peña Comas)
 Hebert Vásquez — "Azucena" (Susan Narucki)
 Diego Schissi — "Nene" (Sibelius Piano Trio)
 Aurelio de la Vega — "Recordatio" (Anne Marie Ketchum)
 André Mehmari and Flavio Chamis — "Sonata For Viola and Piano" (André Mehmari and Tatjana Chamis)

Christian
Best Christian Album (Spanish Language)
Alex Campos — Momentos
Barak — Generación RadicalGabriela Cartulano — Tu AmorÁlvaro López and ResQBand — Sol DetenteJaci Velasquez — ConfíoBest Christian Album (Portuguese Language)
Aline Barros — Acenda A Sua Luz
Paulo César Baruk and Leandro Rodrigues — Piano e Voz, Amigos e Pertences 2Fernanda Brum — Ao Vivo Em IsraelPadre Fábio de Melo — ClareouBruna Karla — IncomparávelEli Soares — MemóriasChildren's
Best Children's Album
Various Artists — Marc Anthony for Babies Mariana Bara — ¡Churo! 
 Cantajuego — ¡Viva Mi Planeta 2! Cepillín — Gracias Luis Pescetti  — Queridos (En Vivo) Sophia — Aprendendo Ritmos da AméricaRecording Package field
Best Recording Package
 Carlos Dussán, Juliana Jaramillo, Juan Felipe Martínez and Claudio Roncoli — El Orisha de la Rosa (Magín Díaz)
 André Coelho and Mariana Hardy — Na Medida Do Impossível Ao Vivo No Inhotim (Fernanda Takai)
 Lia Cunha — Pirombeira (Pirombeira)
 Barão Di Sarno and Ciça Góes — Sol (Gustavo Galo)
 Fabio Prata — Três no Samba (André Mehmari, Eliane Faria and Gordinho do Surdo)

Production
Best Engineered Album
Josh Gudwin and Tom Coyne — Mis Planes Son Amarte (Juanes)
 Guillermo Bonetto, Nahuel Giganti, My-TBeats and Pedro Pearson — Alas Canciones (Los Cafres)
 Rodrigo de Castro Lopes, Pete Karam and Paul Blakemore — Dance of Time (Eliane Elias)
 Craig Parker Adams, Gabe Roth, Juan Pablo Berreondo and JJ Golden — Ilusión (Gaby Moreno)
 Moogie Canazio, Carlos De Andrade and Ricardo Dias — Zanna (Zanna)

Producer of the Year
Eduardo Cabra
 Eduardo Bergallo
 Moogie Canazio
 Hamilton de Holanda, Marcos Portinari, and Daniel Santiago
 Armando Manzanero

Music video
Best Short Form Music Video
Luis Fonsi featuring Daddy Yankee — "Despacito"
 Bomba Estéreo — "Soy Yo"
 Leiva — "Sincericido"
 Dani Martín —  "Los Charcos"
 Residente with Soko — "Desencuentro"

Best Long Form Music Video
Natalia Lafourcade — Musas, El Documental
 Miguel Bosé — MTV Unplugged Juanes — Mis Planes Son Amarte Grupo Bronco — Primera Fila Guaco — Semblanza''

Multiple Nominations and Awards
The following received multiple nominations:

The following received multiple awards:

References

External links
 Official Site

2017 in Latin music
2017 in Nevada
2017 music awards
2017
November 2017 events in the United States
Latin Grammy Awards, 18